Wiley Young Daniel (September 10, 1946 – May 10, 2019) was a United States district judge of the United States District Court for the District of Colorado.

Early education and career

Born in Louisville, Kentucky, Daniel received a Bachelor of Arts degree from Howard University in 1968 and a Juris Doctor from Howard University School of Law in 1971. He was in private practice in Detroit, Michigan from 1971 to 1977, and was also a director of Wayne County Neighborhood Legal Services from 1974 to 1976, and an adjunct professor at the Detroit College of Law from 1974 to 1977. In 1977, he moved his private practice to Denver, Colorado, and became an adjunct professor at the University of Colorado School of Law, where he continued teaching until 1980. He was also a director of Colorado's Personnel Services Board from 1979 to 1983, and was a director and vice-chair of the Iliff School of Theology in 1983.

Federal judicial service

On March 31, 1995, Daniel was nominated by President Bill Clinton to a seat on the United States District Court for the District of Colorado vacated by Sherman Glenn Finesilver. Daniel was confirmed by the United States Senate on June 30, 1995, and received his commission the same day. He served as chief judge from 2008 to 2013. He took senior status on January 1, 2013 and died on May 10, 2019.

See also 
 List of African-American federal judges
 List of African-American jurists
 List of first minority male lawyers and judges in Colorado

References

External links

1946 births
2019 deaths
Judges of the United States District Court for the District of Colorado
United States district court judges appointed by Bill Clinton
African-American judges
Howard University alumni
Howard University School of Law alumni
Lawyers from Denver
Lawyers from Detroit
Lawyers from Louisville, Kentucky
Detroit College of Law faculty
University of Colorado faculty
University of Colorado Law School faculty
20th-century American judges
21st-century American judges